The third season of Matlock originally aired in the United States on NBC from November 29, 1988, through May 16, 1989.

Cast 
 Andy Griffith as Ben Matlock
 Nancy Stafford as Michelle Thomas
 Julie Sommars as ADA Julie March
 Kene Holliday as Tyler Hudson

Cast notes
 Julie Sommars joined the cast this season
 Kene Holliday departed at the end of the season, but appeared twice more early in Season 4. He missed 7 episodes, because he was sent to a rehabilitation clinic, for his drug and alcohol abuse.
 Kene Holliday was absent for 8 episodes
 Julie Sommars was absent for 15 episodes
 Nancy Stafford was absent for 6 episodes

Episodes 
{| class="wikitable plainrowheaders" style="width:100%;"
|-
! style="background:#006600; color:#fff;"| No. in season
! style="background:#006600; color:#fff;"| No. in series
! style="background:#006600; color:#fff;"| Title
! style="background:#006600; color:#fff;"| Directed by
! style="background:#006600; color:#fff;"| Written by
! style="background:#006600; color:#fff;"| Original air date
! style="background:#006600; color:#fff;"| Viewers(in millions)

|}

References

External links 
 

1988 American television seasons
1989 American television seasons
03